2,6-Dichloroquinone-4-chloroimide (Gibbs reagent) is an organic compound used as an colorimetric indicator to detect phenolic compounds. Upon reaction with phenol itself, 2,6-dichlorophenolindophenol is formed, a chemical that is used as a redox indicator.

References

Chlorimides
Quinones
Organochlorides